Together is a product from Micro Focus, formerly from Borland (acquired by Micro Focus in 2009), formerly from TogetherSoft (acquired by Borland in 2003), that currently integrates a Java IDE, which originally had its roots in JBuilder,  with a UML modeling tool.

The product line was previously sold in three levels of functionality: Together Developer, Together Designer, and Together Architect; however, since 2007, Together has been unified into a single product.  Earlier versions of the Together products were completely proprietary self-contained applications, whereas since the 2006 version Together has been based on Eclipse. The installation allows installing Together using an existing Eclipse installation.

Together is implemented as a set of Eclipse plugins.  Together Developer provides Unified Modeling Language (UML) 1.4 modeling, multilanguage support, physical data modeling, design patterns, source code design pattern recognition, code template design and reuse, documentation generation, and code audits and metrics.  Together adds language-neutral UML 2.0 diagramming, business process modeling, and logical data model, and logical to physical data model transformation and custom pattern support.

Together currently uses the Eclipse 4.3.1 platform.

BPMN diagrams can be created by import from and used to generate output to business process execution language with Web Services definitions (BPEL4WS).
Audits and metrics are provided at both the model and code level,  defined in Object Constraint Language (OCL) 2.0.
Together supports Design Patterns, Java 6, C++, CORBA, and Query/View/Transformation model transformations.

See also
List of UML tools
Rational Rose

References

UML tools
Java development tools
Integrated development environments
Borland